Ermina Zaenah (born November 11, 1928) was an Indonesian actress and film producer who was active in the 1950s and 1960s.

Biography
Zaenah was born in Jambi, a city on the island of Sumatra, Dutch East Indies, on November 11, 1928. She completed her education up to the elementary school level, but soon focused on a career in entertainment. Aside from acting in stage plays, Zaenah led her own musical group, the Los Suita Rama, and performed topeng dance.

In 1951 Zaenah entered the film industry. Originally she performed in productions by a number of companies, including Golden Arrow, Fred Young's Bintang Surabaya, and Tan and Wong Bros. In 1953 she migrated to Djamaluddin Malik's Persari, starring in several films for the company, including Supir Istimewa, Pegawai Tinggi (cited by Film Varia as Zaenah's greatest opportunity to gain domestic fame equal to Titien Sumarni), and Bintang Baru.

In the 1960s, as the domestic film industry was suffering, Zaenah moved behind the camera. She worked as producer on four films: Kamar 13 (Room 13, 1961), Lagu dan Buku (Song and Book, 1961), Bakti (Service, 1963), and Ekspedisi Terakhir (The Last Expedition, 1964). She returned to the theater for a short time when she toured Java with the group Sapta Daya. Her fellow actors during this tour included Astaman, Awaluddin, and M. Budharasa.

By the 1970s Zaenah was working as an entrepreneur, focusing on mercantile efforts.

Filmography
During her fourteen-year career, Zaenah acted in thirty films. She also produced four productions.

Cast

Aku dan Masjarakat (1951)
Seruni Laju (1951)
Pelarian dari Pagar Besi (1951)
Pembalasan (1951)
Bermain dengan Api (1952)
Kekal Abadi (1952)
Kisah Kenangan (1952)
Tiga Pendekar Teruna (1952)
Sangkar Emas (1952)
Siapa Dia (1952)
Surja (1952)
Ajah Kikir (1953)
Asmara Murni (1953)
Bagdad (1953)
Bawang Merah Bawang Putih (1953)
Kenari (1953)
Bintang Baru (1954)
Gara-gara Djanda Muda (1954)
Kasih Sajang (1954)
Pegawai Tinggi (1954)
Supir Istimewa (1954)
Gadis Sesat (1955)
Hadiah 10.000 (1955)
Berdjumpa Kembali (1955)
Lagak Internasional (1955)
Harta Angker (1956)
Kamar Kosong (1956)
Buruh Bengkel (1956)
Sendja Indah (1957)
Ibu Mertua (1960)

Crew

 Kamar 13 (1961)
 Lagu dan Buku (1961)
 Bakti (1963)
 Ekspedisi Terakhir (1964)

References

Works cited

External links

1928 births
Possibly living people
Indonesian film actresses
Indonesian people of Malay descent
People from Jambi
Indonesian film producers